The Toucan Prize is a literary prize given by the city of Munich to the best new publication by a Munich author. It has been awarded since 1965 and is endowed with 6,000 Euros.

Recipients 

1965 Paul Mommertz, Georg Schwarz, Roland Ziersch, Alfons Freiherr von Czibulka, Horst Lange, Otto Freiherr von Taube
1966 Rudolf Schmitt-Sulzthal, Eugen Skasa-Weiß, Isabella Nadolny, Gunter Groll, Carola von Crailsheim, Curt Hohoff
1967 Karl Ude, Oliver Hassencamp, Nina Keller
1969 Anton Sailer, Wilhelm Lukas Kristl, Christa Reinig, Günter Spang, Heinrich Fischer, Tankred Dorst
1971 , Angelika Mechtel, Heinz Piontek, Martin Gregor-Dellin, Rolf Flügel
1973 Marianne Langewiesche, Wolfgang Petzet, Kuno Raeber
1975 Wolfgang Bächler, Charlotte Birnbaum, Heinz Coubier, Armin Eichholz, Herbert Günther, Helmut Walbert
1977 Ernst Günther Bleisch, Karl Hoche, Ursula Knöller, Irina Korschunow, Herbert Rosendorfer, Herbert Schlüter
1979 Carl Amery, Janosch, Kurt Seeberger
1981 Hermann Stahl, Carl Borro Schwerla, Franz Freisleder, Dagmar Nick, Jörg Krichbaum, Barbara Bronnen
1983 Michael Krüger, Rudolf Riedler, Barbara König, Carla Maria Heim, Jörg Graser, Grete Weil
1985 Walter Kolbenhoff, Hans F. Nöhbauer
1987 Uwe Dick, Eberhard Horst, Michael Wachsmann
1989 Herbert Achternbusch, Barbara Maria Kloos, Fred Hepp
1991 Günter Herburger 
1992 Uwe Dick 
1993 Helmut Krausser
1994 Maxim Biller
1995 Christine Scherrmann, Hans Pleschinski
1996 Ernst Augustin
1997 Klaus Böldl 
1998 Günter Ohnemus, Der Tiger auf deiner Schulter
1999 Susanne Röckel, Chinesisches Alphabet – Ein Jahr in Shanghai
2000 Hassouna Mosbahi, Rückkehr nach Tarschisch with the translator Regina Karachouli
2001 Uwe Timm, Rot
2002 Hans Pleschinski, Bildnis eines Unsichtbaren
2003 Simon Werle, Der Schnee der Jahre
2004 Thomas Meinecke, Musik
2005 Thomas Palzer, Ruin
2006 Friedrich Ani, Idylle der Hyänen
2008 Fridolin Schley, Wildes schönes Tier
2009 Robert Hültner, Inspektor Kajetan kehrt zurück
2010 Christopher Hipkiss, Leinwand
 2011 Steven Uhly, Adams Fuge
 2012 Marc Deckert, Die Kometenjäger
 2013 Dagmar Leupold, Unter der Hand
 2014 Nina Jäckle, Der lange Atem
 2015 Lilian Loke, Gold in den Straßen
 2016 Björn Bicker, Was glaubt ihr denn. Urban Prayers
 2017 Jonas Lüscher, Kraft
 2018 Susanne Röckel, Der Vogelgott
 2019 Herbert Kapfer, 1919. Fiktion
 2020 Markus Ostermair, Der Sandler
 2021 Fridolin Schley, Die Verteidigung

See also
 German literature
 List of literary awards
 List of poetry awards
 List of years in literature
 List of years in poetry

References

External links
 

Culture in Munich
German literary awards